Abraham L. Lawyer (1792–1853) was an American politician from New York.

Life
He lived in Cobleskill.

He was a member of the New York State Assembly (Schoharie Co.) in 1830.

He was a member of the New York State Senate (3rd D.) from 1835 to 1838, sitting in the 58th, 59th, 60th and 61st New York State Legislatures.

He was again a member of the State Assembly (Schoharie Co., 2nd D.) in 1851.

Sources
The New York Civil List compiled by Franklin Benjamin Hough (pages 130f, 142, 210, 242 and 287; Weed, Parsons and Co., 1858)
American Ancestry (pg. 48)

1792 births
1853 deaths
Democratic Party New York (state) state senators
New York (state) Jacksonians
19th-century American politicians
People from Cobleskill, New York
Democratic Party members of the New York State Assembly